Hişgədərə or Hişkədərə or Khashka-Dara or Khashkadere or Khashkadara or Keshkedar or Khyshkadar may refer to:
Hişgədərə, Masally, Azerbaijan
Hişgədərə, Siazan, Azerbaijan